Penmanship is the art or skill of writing with the hand and a writing instrument.

Penmanship may also refer to:
 Calligraphy, the art of fancy lettering, the art of giving form to signs in an expressive, harmonious and skillful manner
 Handwriting, a person's particular style of writing by pen or a pencil
 Hand (handwriting), a distinct style of calligraphy in palaeography
 Thomas Penmanship, ring name of professional wrestler Tommasso Whitney